Lorens Berg (January 18, 1862 – September 14, 1924) was a Norwegian teacher and local historian.

Life
Berg was born in Kodal, the son of Amund Andersen (1827–1868) and Anne Kristine Sørensdatter  (1822–1870). He worked as a shepherd and farmhand as a child, and then as a sailor before becoming a teacher in 1881. He taught at Prestbyen in Kodal from 1891 to 1899.

In 1905 Berg published the book Andebu. En Vestfold-bygds historie i 1600-aarene (Andebu: History of a Vestfold Village in the 1600s). He thereby started a practice of local history writing that became pioneering in Norway, based on archival studies and a solid methodical presentation. In less than 20 years he published local history books (bygdebøker) about Brunlanes, Hedrum, Tjølling, Sandar, Tjøme, Nøtterøy, and Stokke.

Berg was appointed a government scholar in 1911. He died in Kristiania (now Oslo) on September 14, 1924. He was buried in the Kodal cemetery on September 19, 1924, where there is a memorial next to his grave. In 1952, a granite statue of Berg by Hans Holmen was unveiled at Prestbyen in Kodal. In 2008, a local historical society, the Lorens Berg Foundation, was established in Andebu.

Publications
1905: Andebu. En Vestfold-bygds historie i 1600-aarene (Andebu: History of a Vestfold Village in the 1600s). Kristiania: Det Mallingske Bogtrykkeri.
1909: "Gaarden Aker i Sem. En Gaardshistorie" (The Aker Farm in Sem. A Rural History). Historisk tidsskrift 20: 232–251.
1909: "Om Jordegodsets Fordeling i Tønsberg Len (det senere Jarlsberg Grevskab) i 1650 og 1701" (Estate Division in Tønsberg County, Later Jarlsberg County, in 1650 and 1701). Historisk tidsskrift 20: 33–66.
1912: "Om bygdehistorie" (Village History). Historisk tidsskrift 22: 86–92.

References

20th-century Norwegian historians
Norwegian government scholars
People from Sandefjord
1862 births
1924 deaths